was a Japanese politician of the Liberal Democratic Party.

Biography
Kawara was a member of the House of Representatives in the Diet (national legislature). A native of Nanao, Ishikawa and graduate of Chuo University, he was elected for the first time in 1972. In 1987, he assumed the post of Director General of the Japan Defense Agency (and again in 1999 to 2000). He resigned a year later after taking responsibility for the Nadashio incident. Kichirō Tazawa replaced him in the post.

He was later appointed construction minister in the Hashimoto cabinet. He retired from politics in 2009. He died in Nanao, Ishikawa, in early January 2013 of pneumonia.

References 

2013 deaths
1937 births
Chuo University alumni
Politicians from Ishikawa Prefecture
Japanese defense ministers
Ministers of Construction of Japan
Members of the House of Representatives (Japan)
Liberal Democratic Party (Japan) politicians
21st-century Japanese politicians
People from Nanao, Ishikawa
Deaths from pneumonia in Japan